GEW may refer to:
 Education and Science Workers' Union (Germany)
 Gera language
 Global Entrepreneurship Week